Travis Cornwall (born February 1, 1990 in Coquitlam, British Columbia) is a professional indoor lacrosse transition who plays for the Las Vegas Desert Dogs in the National Lacrosse League. He was drafted in the 1st round (7th overall) in the 2011 NLL Entry Draft. He won the Minto Cup with the Coquitlam Adanacs in 2010. His brother Jeff plays for the Calgary Roughnecks. On October 25, 2022, Cornwall signed with the Las Vegas Desert Dogs.

Statistics

NLL

References

1990 births
Living people
Calgary Roughnecks players
Canadian lacrosse players
Lacrosse people from British Columbia
Lacrosse transitions
Panther City LC players
Saskatchewan Rush players
Sportspeople from Vancouver

Vancouver Warriors players